Cypripedium candidum, known as the small white lady's slipper or white lady's slipper, is a rare orchid of the genus Cypripedium. It is native to eastern North America across the northern United States and southern Canada.

Distribution
Cypripedium candidum is found from western New York, across southern Ontario to North Dakota, and south to New Jersey and Missouri. There are isolated populations of Cypripedium candidum in Connecticut, Maryland, Manitoba, Virginia, Alabama, and (formerly) Saskatchewan. It is found in alkaline wetland and fens, often fragmented in rich, highly calcareous soils, sedge meadow edges, and calcareous ditches.

Description
It blooms from late May to early June. Its white pouch-like lip, sometimes dotted with maroon on the inside, is accented by tan, green or brown lateral sepals and petals. It has been known to hybridize with the small yellow ladyslipper, C. parviflorum var. makasin, resulting in the natural hybrid Cypripedium × andrewsii. The leaves and stems are slightly pubescent. The plants grow in (generally) long-lived clumps, with some clumps having up to 50 or more flowers. It is a perennial, with horizontal, wiry-rooted rhizomes growing a few centimeters below the surface of the soil, and hence resistant to most prairie fires.

Conservation

Cypripedium candidum is considered rare across Canada, endangered in Ontario, and protected under the Ontario Endangered Species Act. It is believed to be extirpated from Saskatchewan. In Ontario, this orchid has never been common due to limited occurrences of fens in its southern Ontario range. It is now known from only two sites in Ontario. It is threatened in the United States, extirpated from Pennsylvania, endangered in South Dakota and Wisconsin, Kentucky, and Michigan, and rare in Missouri and North Dakota. In Illinois, it was listed as endangered in 1980, downgraded to threatened in 1998, and delisted in 2014, when the Illinois Endangered Species Protection Board considered it to be "recovered and/or more common than originally thought". It is listed in Canada as N2, or endangered. Globally, however, it is listed as G4 (apparently secure) because there are protected sites across its entire range.

Habitat loss due to fragmentation through agriculture and development, suppression of fire, incursions by invasive species, especially reed canary grass (Phalaris arundinacea), dogwood (Cornus sp.), leafy spurge (Euphorbia esula), St. John's wort (Hypericum spp.), and buckthorn (Rhamnus spp.), changes in hydrology, loss of pollinators, hybridization and environmental challenges to the obligate mycorrhizae that support this species are all responsible for its decline. It also has a low seed set caused by often unpollinated flowers. Pollinators for this flower include andrenid and halictid bees. They are observed entering the lip of the flower from the opening to deposit pollen on the stigma while simultaneously brushing the anther to pick up more pollen.

Like many wild orchids, this species has been further endangered by collecting for generally futile attempts at cultivation. It is shade-intolerant and therefore requires substantial management for invasive and woody species as part of any species recovery strategies. Long-term monitoring of this species is being done through various scientific organizations, including the Chicago Botanic Garden's Plants of Concern program. Woody encroachment is considered the greatest modern threat to monitored small white lady's slipper populations in the Chicago region. The Plants of Concern program found significantly more lady's slipper plants when prescribed burning and brush removal were conducted compared to sites without the employment of these management tools.

References

External links
 

candidum
Orchids of Canada
Orchids of the United States
Orchids of Maryland
Flora of the Great Lakes region (North America)
Flora of the Northeastern United States
Flora of the North-Central United States
Flora of the Southeastern United States
Flora of the Appalachian Mountains
Flora of Ontario
Flora of Manitoba
Flora of Saskatchewan
Flora of Virginia
Plants described in 1805